Ill Communication is the fourth studio album by American hip-hop group Beastie Boys, released by Grand Royal Records on May 31, 1994. Co-produced by Beastie Boys and Mario Caldato, Jr., it is among the band's most varied releases, drawing from hip hop, punk rock, jazz, and funk, and continues their trend away from sampling and towards live instruments, which began with their previous release, Check Your Head (1992). The album features musical contributions from Money Mark, Eric Bobo and Amery "AWOL" Smith, and vocal contributions from Q-Tip and Biz Markie. Beastie Boys were influenced by Miles Davis's jazz rock albums On the Corner (1972) and Agharta (1975) while recording Ill Communication.

The album became the band's second number-one album on the U.S. Billboard 200 chart and their second triple platinum album. It was supported by the single "Sabotage", which was accompanied by a music video directed by Spike Jonze that parodied 1970s cop shows.

Singles
"Get It Together", which samples The Moog Machine's cover of "Aquarius/Let the Sunshine In", was released as a single on March 17, 1994.

"Sabotage" was the second single taken from Ill Communication. It was released to radio on May 9, 1994. The backing track of the song was laid down by the band members, driven by MCA's fuzzed and twangy bass, at Tin Pan Alley Studios in New York, and then sat unused for a year, with the working title of "Chris Rock", before vocals were added. According to Ad-Rock in the 2020 documentary Beastie Boys Story, the lyrics are a fictitious rant about how their producer "was the worst person ever and how he was always sabotaging us and holding us back."

"Sure Shot", which features a sample taken from jazz flautist Jeremy Steig's "Howlin' For Judy" as the main instrumental part of the song, was released as a single on May 31, 1994. The album's fourth single, "Root Down", was released in 1995.

Artwork
Mike D and MCA collaborated with Gibran Evans, son of the artist and designer Jim Evans (who designed a hand-drawn typeface specifically for Ill Communication that was used throughout the promotion of the album), to create the album's packaging. The photograph they chose for the front cover was taken by Bruce Davidson in 1964 at a Los Angeles drive-in diner called Tiny Naylor's as part of an assignment for Esquire, but the magazine ultimately did not publish the photos. Although Davidson had not heard the Beastie Boys' music and did not understand it once he did—he later recalled thinking it sounded like a "secret language" when they sent him a demo tape—he agreed to let the band use his photo.

The booklet that came with the album features the artwork "Gaia" by Alex Grey on the middle pages.

Critical reception

Ill Communication placed at number 15 on The Village Voices 1994 Pazz & Jop critics' poll, number 19 on Spins list of the "20 Best Albums of '94", number three on NMEs list of the "Top 50 Albums of 1994", and number 13 on The Wires annual critics' poll. Guitar World included the album in its "Superunknown: 50 Iconic Albums That Defined 1994" list. Rolling Stone included the album in its list of "Essential Recordings of the 90s", and Q included the album in its list of the "90 Best Albums of the 1990s". Mojo ranked the album number 54 on its list of "100 Modern Classics". The album was also included in the book 1001 Albums You Must Hear Before You Die.

Track listing
All tracks produced by Beastie Boys and Mario Caldato, Jr.

Personnel
 Beastie Boys – producers
 Adam "Ad-Rock" Horovitz – vocals, guitar
 Adam "MCA" Yauch – vocals, electric bass, string bass
 Michael "Mike D" Diamond – vocals, drums
 Money Mark – keyboards, organ
 Eric Bobo – percussion; drums on "Ricky's Theme"
 Amery Smith – drums on "Tough Guy" & "Heart Attack Man"
 Eugene Gore – violin on "Eugene's Lament"
 Q-Tip – vocals on "Get It Together"
 Biz Markie – vocals on "Do It"
 Mario Caldato, Jr. – producer

Charts

Weekly charts

Year-end charts

Certifications

See also
 List of Billboard 200 number-one albums of 1994

References 

Works cited

External links
 

1994 albums
Beastie Boys albums
Capitol Records albums
Grand Royal albums
Albums produced by Mario Caldato Jr.